Abū ʾl-Qāsim al-Faḍl ibn al-Muqtadir (913/14 – September/October 974), better known by his regnal name of al-Mutīʿ li-ʾllāh, was the Abbasid caliph in Baghdad from 946 to 974, ruling under the tutelage of the Buyid emirs.

Al-Muti's reign represented the nadir of the Abbasid caliphate's power and authority. In previous decades, the secular authority of the caliphs had shrunk to Iraq, and even there had been curtailed by powerful warlords; with the Buyid conquest of Baghdad, it was now abolished entirely. Al-Muti' was raised to the throne by the Buyids and was effectively reduced to a rubber-stamp figurehead, albeit with some vestiges of authority over judicial and religious appointments in Iraq. The very fact of his subordination and powerlessness helped restore some stability to the caliphal institution: in stark contrast to his short-lived and violently deposed predecessors, al-Muti' enjoyed a long and relatively unchallenged tenure, and was able to hand over the throne to his son al-Ta'i.

Al-Muti's prestige as the nominal leader of the Muslim world sharply declined during his tenure. Regional rivals to the Buyids delayed their recognition of al-Muti's caliphate, seeing in him only a Buyid puppet, and his inability to respond effectively to Byzantine advances tarnished his reputation. More importantly, the rise of Shi'a regimes across the Middle East directly challenged Sunni and Abbasid predominance. The Buyids themselves were Shi'a, but they retained the Abbasid caliphate out of expedience. Further west, the expanding Fatimid Caliphate posed a direct ideological and political challenge to the Abbasids. During al-Muti's reign, the Fatimids conquered Egypt and started to expand into the Levant, threatening Baghdad itself.

Biography

Early life
The future al-Muti' was born in Baghdad in 913/14 as al-Fadl, a son of the Abbasid caliph, al-Muqtadir, and a Slavic concubine, Mash'ala. He was the brother of caliphs al-Radi and al-Muttaqi. Al-Muti' grew up in a time of crisis. Al-Muqtadir's reign was marked by factional strife, attacks by the Qarmatians, economic decline and revenue shortages that led to military unrest, culminating in the murder of the caliph in 932. During the subsequent reigns of al-Radi and al-Muttaqi, the Abbasid central government lost control of the provinces to regional military strongmen. Al-Muttaqi himself had been raised to the throne by the  Bajkam, but attempted to play off the regional warlords—notably the Hamdanids of Mosul—to recover the independence and authority of his office. These attempts ended in failure, and resulted in his deposition and blinding by the  Tuzun in September 944.

As the chief of the remaining sons of al-Muqtadir and brother of the two previous caliphs, al-Fadl was an obvious candidate for the throne. Tuzun instead chose al-Mustakfi, a son of Caliph al-Muktafi. The medieval sources report that al-Mustakfi and al-Fadl hated each other, and quarreled already during their stay in the Tahirid Palace as young princes. Not only were they members of two rival lines of succession, but their characters were diametrically opposed: though al-Fadl, like his father, was renowned for his piety, al-Mustakfi offended pious opinion by his association with the  militia—drawn from the poorer urban classes, they were often decried as troublemakers and suspected for their association with heterodox and sectarian groups like the Sufis—and his participation in 'vulgar' games. Once al-Mustakfi was enthroned, he sent his agents to capture al-Muti', but the latter had already gone into hiding, and the caliph had to satisfy himself with demolishing his house. This futile act only served to mark al-Fadl as a serious rival; on hearing of it, the veteran vizier, Ali ibn Isa, is said to have remarked that "This day he [al-Fadl] has been acknowledged heir to the throne."

Caliphate

Rise to the throne

In December 945, the Daylamite troops of the Buyid ruler Mu'izz al-Dawla seized Baghdad. Mu'izz al-Dawla became the de facto 'protector' of the Abbasid caliph, although the title of  apparently passed to his older brother, Imad al-Dawla, who was reckoned as the chief Buyid emir. The sudden reappearance of al-Muti', and his rise to the throne, was apparently a surprise to contemporaries, and led to stories that he had conspired with the Buyids already since the time of al-Muktafi's accession.

Medieval sources tended to justify this change on religious grounds. The Buyids and their followers were Shi'a sympathizers, and two later chroniclers, Muhammad ibn Abd al-Malik al-Hamadhani (d. 1127) and Ibn al-Athir (d. 1233), report that Mu'izz al-Dawla toyed with the idea of deposing the Abbasids outright and installing an Alid on the throne of Baghdad, only to be dissuaded by his secretary, Abu Ja'far al-Saymari, who pointed out that in a clash between himself and a Shi'a caliph, the Daylamite soldiery were likely to side with the latter. This is clearly a later anachronistic interpolation, and the historian John Donohue disclaims any religious motivation in al-Mustakfi's deposition. Other chroniclers provide several reasons, such as the caliph's intrigues with the Hamdanids, or al-Fadl's emerging from hiding and inciting the Buyid ruler against his cousin, but the chief reason was likely simply that Mu'izz al-Dawla wished to have a caliph who was under his full control with no external sources of support.

The deposed al-Mustakfi was blinded, apparently as a revenge act initiated by al-Muti', and spent the rest of his life as a prisoner in the caliphal palace, where he died in September 949.

Role and relations with the Buyids
Al-Muti' was a weak figure, for all intents and purposes a puppet ruler of the Buyid ruler of Iraq, first Mu'izz al-Dawla, and then his son, Izz al-Dawla. As a result of his lack of real power, al-Muti' himself barely figures in the chronicles of his reign, and medieval historians generally considered his tenure as the lowest ebb of the Abbasid caliphate, an opinion shared by modern scholars as well.

In theory, the Buyids and all their officials in Iraq continued to act in the name of the Abbasid caliph, and all appointments and legal acts continued to be made in his name. In practice, al-Muti' was deprived of any meaningful authority. In exchange for being allowed to lead a comfortable and secure life in the vast caliphal palaces, he served to provide legitimacy to the upstart Buyid regime in the eyes of the Muslim world. The options of abolishing the caliphate or installing an Alid as caliph were quickly rejected, if they were ever seriously entertained: such an act would cause widespread opposition, another Sunni caliphate might easily be set up elsewhere, but a docile caliph under Buyid control would help maintain the obedience of the Sunni majority to the new regime, as well as lend its symbolic weight to the Buyids in their relations with the other Muslim princes. Furthermore, there was a lack of suitable Alid candidates: the last imam of the Twelver Shi'a, who represented the main strand of Shi'a followers in the Buyid domains, was held to have gone into occultation seventy years earlier, and Zaydi doctrine held that the imams had to seize power themselves if they were to be legitimate.

The Buyids quickly integrated themselves into the traditional Abbasid system and eagerly sought the legitimacy conferred by the caliph, in the form of honorific titles and diplomas of governorship, or in his signature in treaties. At the same time, al-Muti' was effectively reduced to a salaried state official, and his responsibility was curtailed to the oversight over the judiciary, religious institutions, and the affairs of the members of the wider Abbasid clan. In reality, judicial appointments too were under the purview of the Buyid emir, but at least for the more senior ones, such as the chief  of Baghdad, the caliph was expected to provide his assent, the robe of honour and the requisite diploma. With one known exception, al-Muti' generally complied with the emir's appointments. 

The Buyids kept a close watch on the caliph, especially during their periodic conflicts with the Hamdanids, lest he might try to defect to them, as al-Muttaqi had done. During the battles of summer 946, when the Hamdanids briefly occupied East Baghdad, he was kept under house arrest in a church in West Baghdad, and not released until he had sworn an oath of loyalty to the Buyids. Whenever Mu'izz al-Dawla campaigned against rebels south of Baghdad, al-Muti' was forced to accompany the Buyid ruler, lest he defect north to the Hamdanids. Conversely, when the Buyid  campaigned against the Hamdanids in the north, al-Muti' was left behind in Baghdad. In 948/49, Ispahdost, Mu'izz al-Dawla's brother-in-law, was arrested on suspicion of conspiring with al-Muti' (or with an unnamed Alid).

Upon taking power, Mu'izz al-Dawla distributed the former caliphal crown domains for the upkeep of the army, and al-Muti' had to content himself with a daily salary of 2,000 silver dirhams. When Basra was recovered from the Baridi family shortly after, he was assigned extensive possessions there, raising his income to 200,000 gold dinars per year. Although the general decline of Iraq later reduced his income by three quarters of its original value, this allowed the caliph to financially support members of the Abbasid clan in need, and to make rich gifts to the Kaaba. The income also sufficed for the construction of a series of pavilions in the caliphal palace grounds: the Peacock Palace, the Octagon House and the Square House.

The troubled relations between the caliph and the Buyids gradually assumed a more regular and tranquil character: the Buyids at least formally respected the caliph's remaining responsibilities, and al-Muti' apparently accepted his subservient role, regained some freedom of action, and maintained cordial relations with Mu'izz al-Dawla. In 955/56, Mu'izz al-Dawla even appointed his 13-year-old son, the future Izz al-Dawla, as the caliph's chamberlain. This was opposed by both Sunni and Shi'a scholars as illegal, and al-Muti' refused to sign the appointments made by Mu'izz al-Dawla during this period. This is also almost the only reference in the sources to al-Muti's activity in the religious or judicial sphere; otherwise his reign is passed over in silence.

A positive corollary of this subservience was stability. Although of a sickly disposition, al-Muti' reigned as caliph for 29 Hijri years and four months, in stark contrast to his short-lived predecessors, and unlike them had to contend with remarkably few rival pretenders to the caliphate. A grandson of al-Muktafi rebelled in Armenia in 960 and claimed the caliphate as al-Mustajir Billah before being defeated by the local Sallarid rulers. In 968, Abu'l-Hasan Muhammad, a son of al-Mustakfi, who had fled to the Ikhshidid court in Egypt, gained considerable support in Iraq by hiding his identity and posing as the Mahdi (the Islamic messiah). The leading convert to his cause was a Buyid commander, the Turk Sübüktegin al-Ajami, who gave him protection and was preparing to mount a coup in his name, before his identity was uncovered and he was handed over to al-Muti'. The caliph did not severely punish him, other than ordering his nose cut off, thereby disqualifying him from the succession; although Abu'l-Hasan Muhammad eventually managed to escape, his hopes of seizing the throne were never realized, and the caliphal succession henceforth firmly remained with the line of al-Muqtadir.

Facing the Shi'a and Byzantine challenges

Outside the Buyid domains, on the other hand, the Abbasid caliph's authority over the wider Muslim world declined. Until the conclusion of a peace with the Buyids in 955, the Samanids of Khurasan refused to acknowledge his caliphate, and, in the west, the rival Isma'ili Shi'a Fatimid Caliphate was growing more and more powerful, conquering Egypt in 969 and beginning its expansion into the Levant. Even in Baghdad, the pro-Shi'a sympathies of the Buyids meant that Shi'a influence, although numerically small, was growing. Shi'a practices were introduced in the city, such as the ritual condemnation of the Umayyad caliph Mu'awiya, or the celebration of the Ghadir Khumm festival, attested since 963. Alids assumed the leadership of the annual Hajj caravans, and street clashes between Sunni and Shi'a partisans are recorded in several years during this period.

At the same time, al-Muti' played a leading role as a mediator in the formation of an anti-Fatimid coalition that included the Qarmatians under al-Hasan al-A'sam and the Hamdanid ruler of Mosul, Abu Taghlib, with the backing of the Buyids. This coalition managed to stop the Fatimid expansion into the Levant until 973/74. In 951, when the Qarmatians returned the Black Stone to the Kaaba in Mecca, whence they had taken it in 930, al-Muti' is rumoured to have paid them 30,000 gold dinars as the Stone's ransom.

Another source of danger was the Byzantine advance against the Hamdanids in Upper Mesopotamia and northern Syria. In the 960s the Byzantines broke the centuries-old border at the Taurus Mountains and seized Cilicia and Antioch, reducing the Hamdanid emirate of Aleppo to a tributary vassal in the process. In 972, the Byzantine raids reached Nisibis, Amida, and Edessa. Muslim refugees from these cities flooded to Baghdad and clamoured for protection. Unwilling and unable to help, Izz al-Dawla pointed them to al-Muti', since the jihad was still formally the caliph's responsibility. Bereft of any military or financial resources, al-Muti' was powerless to help them, and his prestige suffered accordingly; the riots engulfed the Shi'a quarter of Karkh, which went up in flames. Izz al-Dawla used the opportunity to pressure al-Muti' into selling off his valuables and providing 400,000 dirhams, ostensibly to be used to employ soldiers against the Byzantines. Al-Muti' protested in a much-quoted letter, but had no option but to comply; the money was soon squandered by the profligate Buyid ruler. This act proved to be a costly political mistake for Izz al-Dawla, further alienating Sunni sympathies in Baghdad, where his control grew even more tenuous.

Abdication and death
Over the years, Izz al-Dawla increasingly alienated his Turkic soldiery, under their commander Sabuktakin, culminating in a failed assassination attempt on the latter. The Turks had also gained the support of the Sunni populace in Baghdad after putting down the riots in 972. As a result, on 1 August 974, Sabuktakin seized control of Baghdad from Izz al-Dawla.

When the coup happened, al-Muti' left Baghdad along with the members of the Buyid clan, but Sabuktakin forced him back and confined him to his palace. Of advanced years, and with his right side paralyzed following a stroke in 970, al-Muti' was induced to abdicate with his health as a pretext, and was replaced by his son Abd al-Karim, as al-Ta'i, on 5 August. This was the first father-to-son succession of the caliphate since al-Muktafi in 902.

Sabuktakin had himself appointed  by the new caliph, and left Baghdad to campaign against the Buyids, accompanied by both al-Muti' and al-Ta'i. Al-Muti' died on the way, at Dayr al-Aqul, on 12 October 974. He was buried at the mausoleum of his paternal grandmother, Shaghab, in the Baghdad quarter of al-Rusafa, where his brother al-Radi had also been buried.

Notes

References

Sources 
 
 
 
 
 
 
 
 
 
 
 
 

914 births
974 deaths
10th-century Abbasid caliphs
10th century in Iraq
Monarchs who abdicated
People under the Buyid dynasty
Sons of Abbasid caliphs